The Meril-Prothom Alo Critics Choice Award for Best Playwright began in 1998 in Bangladesh recognizing people in the film industry.

Winners and nominees
Winners are listed first in the coloured row, followed by the other nominees.

 Tariq Anam Khan (1998)
 Abul Hayat (1999)
 Masum Reza (2000)
 Ratan Paul (2001)
 Nurul Alam Atique (2002)
 Giasuddin Selim (2003)
 Giasuddin Selim (2004)
 Muhammed Zafar Iqbal (2005) (Ekti Shundor Shokal)
 Masum Reza (2006) (Modhu Moyra)
 Litu Shakhawat (2007) (Fera)
 Nurul Alam Atique & Ranjan Rabbani (2008) (Ekti Phone Kora Jabe Please?)
 Nurul Alam Atique (2009) (Bikol Pakhir Gaan)
 Iftekhar Ahmed Fahmi (2010) (Seluloed Man)
 Monoar Kabir (2011)
 Azad Abul Kalam (2012) (Sobuj Velvet)
 Partho Shahriar (2013) (Jong Kutumbpur)
 Monirul Islam Rubel (2014) (Protidin Shonibar)
 Ashraful Chanchal (2015) (Shonibar Raat Doshta Chollish Minute)
 Sarower Reza Jimi (2016) (Jog Biyog)
 Ashfaque Nipun (2017)

2010s

References

Directing
Award ceremonies in Bangladesh
Bangladeshi screenwriters